James Adamson Mathieson (10 May 1904 – 13 April 1950) was a Scottish professional footballer who played as a goalkeeper in the Football League for Middlesbrough and Brentford. He made over 500 professional appearances in the English and Scottish leagues. Mathieson is the only player to win three English Second Division championship medals, as an ever-present in each season.

Career

Early years 
A goalkeeper, Mathieson began his career in Scotland with junior clubs Dubbleside Hearts and Colinsburgh United. He got his break when he signed for Scottish League First Division club Partick Thistle in 1922. Mathieson moved to fellow top flight club Raith Rovers the following year and made 92 league appearances in three seasons before departing after Rovers' relegation to the Second Division was confirmed at the end of the 1925–26 season.

Middlesbrough 
Mathieson moved to England to join Second Division club Middlesbrough in June 1926. He was an ever-present in the Boro team which was promoted to the First Division as Second Division champions in the 1926–27 season, giving Mathieson his first taste of top flight football in England. Middlesbrough were relegated straight back to the Second Division, but with Mathieson again an ever-present in goal, the club won promotion straight back as Division Two champions in the 1928–29 season. He made 264 appearances for the club before departing in 1934.

Brentford 
Mathieson dropped to the Second Division to sign for Brentford during the 1934 off-season. He was one of a number of former Middlesbrough players recruited by Bees manager Harry Curtis in the early 1930s and he linked up with former teammates Jack Holliday, Billy Scott, Herbert Watson and Ernie Muttitt at Griffin Park. Mathieson went straight into the team and was an ever-present during the 1934–35 season, helping Brentford to the Second Division title and promotion to the top-flight for the first time in the club's history. He missed just one league game during the 1935–36 season, as the Bees finished in their highest-ever league placing of fifth in the First Division. Mathieson lost his place in goal to another Scot, Joe Crozier, during the 1937–38 season and departed the club at the end of the campaign. He made 129 appearances during his four years with Brentford.

Queen of the South 
Mathieson returned to Scotland in 1938 and joined Dumfries club Queen of the South, then in Scotland's top tier. Things went well for Mathieson during the 1938–39 season at Queens, with the club finishing in sixth position and reaching the quarter finals of the Scottish Cup. He made 38 league appearances before the breakout of the Second World War ended his career in 1939.

Personal life 
Before becoming a professional footballer, Mathieson worked as a miner.

Career statistics

Honours 
Middlesbrough
Football League Second Division: 1926–27, 1928–29
Brentford
 Football League Second Division: 1934–35

References

Date of death unknown
People from Methil
Scottish footballers
Association football goalkeepers
Brentford F.C. players
English Football League players
1904 births
Partick Thistle F.C. players
Scottish Football League players
Raith Rovers F.C. players
Middlesbrough F.C. players
Queen of the South F.C. players
1950 deaths
Dundee F.C. wartime guest players
St Bernard's F.C. wartime guest players